Benthesicymus is a genus of prawns, containing the following species:

Benthesicymus altus Spence Bate, 1881
Benthesicymus armatus MacGilchrist, 1905
Benthesicymus bartletti Smith, 1882
Benthesicymus brasiliensis Spence Bate, 1881
Benthesicymus cereus Burkenroad, 1936
Benthesicymus crenatus Spence Bate, 1881
Benthesicymus howensis Dall, 2001
Benthesicymus investigatoris Alcock & Anderson, 1899
Benthesicymus iridescens Spence Bate, 1881
Benthesicymus laciniatus Rathbun, 1906
Benthesicymus seymouri Tirmizi, 1960
Benthesicymus strabus Burkenroad, 1936
Benthesicymus tanneri Faxon, 1893
Benthesicymus tirmiziae Crosnier, 1978
Benthesicymus urinator Burkenroad, 1936

A single fossil species, formerly included in the genus Benthesicymus, is now placed in a separate genus, Palaeobenthesicymus.

A 2020 study showed Benthesicymus to be paraphyletic with five robust clades, 4 of which were diagnosed as new genera:

Bathicaris , gen. nov.
Bathicaris brasiliensis , comb. nov.
Bathicaris cereus , comb. nov.
Bathicaris iridescens , comb. nov.
Bathicaris seymouri , comb. nov.
Bathicaris strabus , comb. nov.
Bathicaris urinator , comb. nov.
Dalicaris , gen. nov.
Dalicaris altus , comb. nov.
Maorrancaris , gen. nov.
Maorrancaris investigatoris , comb. nov
Trichocaris , gen. nov.
Trichocaris bartletti , comb. nov.
Trichocaris tanneri , comb. nov.
Trichocaris tirmiziae , comb. nov.

References

Dendrobranchiata